KRZK (106.3 FM) is a radio station broadcasting a classic country format. Licensed to Branson, Missouri, United States, it serves the Springfield, Missouri, area. The station is currently owned by Mike Huckabee, through licensee Ozark Mountain Media Group, LLC.

KRZK was originally owned by Turtle Broadcasting Company of Branson, a subsidiary of Orr & Earls Broadcasting, Inc. It was purchased in 1986 along with KRZK-FM which were off the air at the time. Co-principal, Roderick Orr, sold his interest in the company to Charles Earles in 2004. Earls Broadcasting sold the station to Ozark Mountain Media Group effective December 10, 2018.

Format history
September 1991 - December 3, 2012 Country Music

December 3, 2012 - May 27, 2016: Your News. Straight Talk.

May 27, 2016 - June 30, 2017: Classic Hits/Today's Talk

June 30, 2017 - August 27, 2020: Branson's Official Hometown Country Station 

August 27, 2020 : Legends 106.3

On-air personalities

Previous logo

References

External links
KRZK 106.3 Facebook

RZK
Classic country radio stations in the United States